Expedition 21 was the 21st long-duration mission to the International Space Station (ISS). The expedition began on 11 October 2009, with Frank de Winne becoming the first ESA astronaut to command a space mission.

The handover between Expedition 20 and Expedition 21 required three Soyuz vehicles being docked to the station at the same time, the first time this has occurred.

Soyuz TMA-16 brought the final members of Expedition 21 to the ISS, along with space tourist Guy Laliberté. Laliberté returned to Earth on Soyuz TMA-14 with two members of Expedition 20 on 11 October 2009.

Nicole P. Stott was the last ISS expedition crew member to fly on the Space Shuttle. She returned to Earth aboard STS-129 in November 2009.

Crew

Source NASA

Backup crew 
 André Kuipers - Commander
 Dimitri Kondratyev
 Chris Hadfield
 Shannon Walker
 Aleksandr Skvortsov
 Catherine Coleman

References

External links

NASA's Space Station Expeditions page
Expedition 21 Photography

Expeditions to the International Space Station
2009 in spaceflight